Piz Rots (also known as Vesilspitze) is a mountain of the Samnaun Alps, located on the Austria–Switzerland border. It lies south-west of Samnaun.

References

External links
 Piz Rots on Hikr

Mountains of the Alps
Alpine three-thousanders
Mountains of Switzerland
Mountains of Tyrol (state)
Austria–Switzerland border
International mountains of Europe
Mountains of Graubünden
Samnaun